Zhitnya is a rural locality (a settlement) in Pochepsky District, Bryansk Oblast, Russia. The population was 428 as of 2010. There is 1 street.

Geography 
Zhitnya is located 10 km northwest of Pochep (the district's administrative centre) by road. Zhitnya (village) is the nearest rural locality.

References 

Rural localities in Pochepsky District